Form & Function Vol. 2 is Photek's fourth studio album. It is a collection of dubplates and remixes plus some exclusives. It was released September 24, 2007 on the Sanctuary Records label. There was also a vinyl release of the LP for DJs.

Track listing 
"Industry of Noise" – 5:27
"Love & War (Album Version)" – 5:04
Featuring Chiara (vocals)
"Things" – 5:53
Featuring Robert Owens (vocals)
"Ni Ten Ichi Ryu (TeeBee remix)" – 5:04
"Deadly Technology" – 5:32
"Sidewinder (Hochi & Infiltrata remix)" – 6:50
"One Nation" – 5:50
"Saturated Hip Hop" – 6:35
"Man Down" – 6:06
Featuring Tech Itch & Teebee
"Thunder (Die & Clipz remix)" – 5:51
"The Beginning" – 5:16
"Full Spectrum Dominance" – 6:15
Featuring Hochi
"Baltimore (Tech Itch & Dylan remix)" – 6:58

References

Photek albums
2007 compilation albums
Sanctuary Records compilation albums